Events from the year 1672 in Sweden

Incumbents
 Monarch – Charles XI

Events

 
 Alliance between Sweden and France.
 The King is declared to legal majority, and the regency government is thereby dissolved.
 Hervarar saga by Olof Verelius.
 Sten Nilsson Bielke is appointed Lord High Treasurer of Sweden.
 Carlsburg, Weser

Births

 27 October - Maria Gustava Gyllenstierna, writer (died 1737) 
 Hedvig Mörner, politically influential countess (died 1753)

Deaths

 Agneta Horn, memoir writer (died 1629) 
 Georg Stiernhielm, linguist and poet (died 1598) 
 Märet Jonsdotter, alleged witch (born 1644)

References

 
Years of the 17th century in Sweden
Sweden